Mohammad Amin Darvishi; is an Iranian football forward who plays for Iranian football club Paykan in the Persian Gulf Pro League.

Club career

Albadr Bandar Kong
Darvishi started his career with Albadr Bandar Kong from youth levels. He was promoted to first team in summer 2012. He was part of Albadr Bandar Kong in promoting to 2013–14 Azadegan League.

Gostaresh Foolad
He joined Gostaresh Foolad in summer 2014. He made his debut for Gostaresh Foolad on August 19, 2014 against Paykan as a substitute for Mehdi Nazari.

Club career statistics

References

External links
 Mohammad Amin Darvishi at IranLeague.ir
Mohammad Amin Darvishi on instagram

1993 births
Living people
Iranian footballers
Sanat Naft Abadan F.C. players
Gostaresh Foulad F.C. players
Gol Gohar players
Paykan F.C. players
Association football forwards
People from Hormozgan Province